Love Songs is a 2005 album by trombonist Harry Watters.  Though on the cover "Love Songs" seems to be only the subtitle, this is used as the full title on Watters’ website .

Personnel
Harry Watters - trombone
Dan Roberts - piano
Steve Fidyk - drums
Glenn Dewey - bass

Track listing
 "All the Things You Are" (Hammerstein/Kern) – 4:42
 "You Stepped Out of a Dream"(Nacio Herb Brown) – 5:20
 "But Beautiful" (Van Heusen/Burke) – 6:18
 "Just Squeeze Me" (Duke Ellington) – 6:43
 "Night and Day" (Cole Porter) – 5:42
 "My One And Only Love" (R. Mellin/G. Wood) – 6:44
 "Am I Blue" (words - Grant Clarke, music - Harry Akst) – 5:39
 "Angel Eyes" (words - Earl Brent, music - Matt Dennis)– 8:59
 "When My Dreamboat Comes Home" (Dave Franklin/Cliff Friend) – 5:49

External links
News release at the Harry Watters website
Media samples at the Harry Watters website

2005 albums
Harry Watters albums